The RAC 124 was a stimulation drink with a lightly peach flavor, sold in a silver 250ml can. It was designed by the RAC Foundation and the makers of the drink Sprite to help get tired motorists home safely if they felt sleepy at the wheel. It was intended to give the drinker a 15-30 minute boost at most. It was sold in the early 2000s at garages and convenience stores only.

Stats

External links
 Data
 Need To Know 2002-01-11
 Buy | Compare prices for on Ciao!
 Info
Sprite official website

Energy drinks
Non-alcoholic drinks
Coca-Cola brands